Statistics of American Soccer League II in season 1977.

League standings

ASL All-Stars

Playoffs

Bracket

Division semifinals

Division finals

Championship final

References

American Soccer League II (RSSSF)

	

 
American Soccer League (1933–1983) seasons
2